Girgentina is a white-wine grape from Malta. Together with Ġellewża it is one of only two indigenous grapes on the island. Probably brought to the island from Sicily by the Phoenicians (the following modern name comes from “Girgenti”, the ancient Agrigento) according to the Maltese viticulture feature article by the essayist Luca Farinotti, published in Times of Malta. Wine from girgentina is exquisite and fresh. The alcohol content is only of 10%.

See also
Maltese wine

References

White wine grape varieties
Grape varieties of Malta